St Edward's Crown is the centrepiece of the  Crown Jewels of the United Kingdom. Named after Saint Edward the Confessor, versions of it have traditionally been used to crown English and British monarchs at their coronations since the 13th century.

The original crown was a holy relic kept at Westminster Abbey, Edward's burial place, until the regalia were either sold or melted down when Parliament abolished the monarchy in 1649, during the English Civil War.

The current St Edward's Crown was made for Charles II in 1661. The crown is similar in weight and overall appearance to the original, but its arches are Baroque.

After 1689, it was not used to crown any monarch for over 200 years. In 1911, the tradition was revived by George V and has continued ever since. In 1953, Elizabeth II opted for a stylised image of this crown to be used on coats of arms and other insignia in Commonwealth realms to symbolise her royal authority.

St Edward's Crown is normally on public display in the Jewel House at the Tower of London.

Description
It has four fleurs-de-lis alternating with four crosses pattée, which support two dipped arches topped by a monde and cross pattée. Its purple velvet cap is trimmed with ermine. The crown features 444 precious and semi-precious stones, including 345 rose-cut aquamarines, 37 white topazes, 27 tourmalines, 12 rubies, 7 amethysts, 6 sapphires, 2 jargoons, 1 garnet, 1 spinel and 1 carbuncle.

Usage
Although it is regarded as the official coronation crown, only six monarchs have been crowned with St Edward's Crown since the Restoration: Charles II (1661), James II (1685), William III (1689), George V (1911), George VI (1937) and Elizabeth II (1953). Mary II and Anne were crowned with small diamond crowns of their own; George I, George II, George III and William IV with the State Crown of George I; George IV with a large new diamond crown made specially for the occasion; and Queen Victoria and Edward VII chose not to use St Edward's Crown because of its weight and instead used the lighter 1838 Imperial State Crown. When not used to crown the monarch, St Edward's Crown rested on the high altar; however, it did not feature at all in Queen Victoria's coronation.

In heraldry
St Edward's Crown is widely used as a heraldic emblem of the United Kingdom, being incorporated into a multitude of emblems and insignia. As the United Kingdom is a constitutional monarchy with responsible government, the crown can also symbolise "the sovereignty (or authority) of the monarch." During the reign of Elizabeth II it was found on, amongst others, the Royal Cypher; the Royal Arms of the United Kingdom; the Royal Badges of England; and the badges of the police forces of England and Wales, NHS ambulance services, His Majesty's Coastguard, the British Army, the Royal Marines, the Royal Air Force and HM Revenue and Customs. It also formed the logo of Royal Mail, the United Kingdom's postal service. (In Scotland, the Crown of Scotland may appear in place of St Edward's Crown).

Following the death of Queen Elizabeth II, the design of King Charles III's royal cypher was announced in September 2022, which featured the Tudor Crown rather than the St Edward’s Crown. According to the College of Arms, it is envisioned that the Tudor Crown will now be used in representations of the Royal Arms, badges and military uniforms.

History

Origin

Edward the Confessor wore his crown at Easter, Whitsun, and Christmas. In 1161, he was made a saint, and objects connected with his reign became holy relics. The monks at his burial place of Westminster Abbey claimed that Edward had asked them to look after his regalia in perpetuity for the coronations of all future English kings. Although the claim is likely to have been an exercise in self-promotion on the abbey's part, and some of the regalia probably had been taken from Edward's grave when he was reinterred there, it became accepted as fact, thereby establishing the first known set of hereditary coronation regalia in Europe. A crown referred to as St Edward's Crown is first recorded as having been used for the coronation of Henry III in 1220, and it appears to be the same crown worn by Edward.

Holy relic
An early description of the crown is "King Alfred's Crown of gold wire-work set with slight stones and two little bells", weighing  and valued at £248 in total. It was sometimes called King Alfred's Crown because of an inscription on the lid of its box, which, translated from Latin, read: "This is the chief crown of the two, with which were crowned Kings Alfred, Edward and others". However, there is no evidence to support the belief that it dated from Alfred's time, and in the coronation order it always has been referred to as St Edward's Crown.

St Edward's Crown rarely left Westminster Abbey, but when Richard II was forced to abdicate in 1399, he had the crown brought to the Tower of London, where he symbolically handed it to Henry IV, saying "I present and give to you this crown with which I was crowned King of England and all the rights dependent on it".

It was used in 1533 to crown the second wife of Henry VIII, Anne Boleyn, which was unprecedented for a queen consort. In the Tudor period, three crowns were placed on the heads of monarchs at a coronation: St Edward's Crown, the state crown, and a "rich crown" made specially for the king or queen.  After the English Reformation, the new Church of England denounced the veneration of medieval relics and, starting with the coronation of Edward VI in 1547, the significance of St Edward's Crown as a holy relic was played down in the ceremony.

During the English Civil War, Parliament sold the medieval St Edward's Crown, regarded by Oliver Cromwell as symbolic of the "detestable rule of kings".

Restoration

The monarchy was restored in 1660 and in preparation for the coronation of Charles II, who had been living in exile abroad, a new St Edward's Crown was supplied by the Royal Goldsmith, Sir Robert Vyner. It was fashioned to closely resemble the medieval crown, with a heavy gold base and clusters of semi-precious stones, but the arches are decidedly Baroque. In the late 20th century, it was assumed to incorporate gold from the original St Edward's Crown, as they are almost identical in weight, and no invoice was produced for the materials in 1661. A crown was also displayed at the lying in state of Oliver Cromwell, Lord Protector of England from 1653 until 1658. On the weight of this evidence, writer and historian Martin Holmes, in a 1959 paper for Archaeologia, concluded that in the time of the Interregnum St Edward's Crown was saved from the melting pot and that its gold was used to make a new crown at the Restoration.

His theory became accepted wisdom, and many books, including official guidebooks for the Crown Jewels at the Tower of London, repeated his claim as fact. In 2008, new research found that a coronation crown and sceptre were made in 1660 in anticipation of an early coronation, which had to be delayed several times. His other regalia were commissioned in 1661 after Parliament increased the budget as a token of their appreciation for the king. The crown at Cromwell's lying in state was probably made of gilded base metal such as tin or copper, as was usual in 17th-century England; for example, a crown displayed at the funeral of James VI and I had cost only £5 and was decorated with fake jewels.

In 1671, Thomas Blood briefly stole the crown from the Tower of London, flattening it with a mallet in an attempt to conceal it. A new monde was created for the coronation of James II, and for William III the base was changed from a circle to an oval. After the coronation of William III in 1689, monarchs chose to be crowned with a lighter, bespoke coronation crown (e.g., the Coronation Crown of George IV) or their state crown, while St Edward's Crown usually rested on the high altar.

20th to 21st century
 
Edward VII intended to revive the tradition of being crowned with St Edward's Crown in 1902, but on coronation day he was still recovering from an operation for appendicitis, and instead he wore the lighter Imperial State Crown.

Jewels were hired for use in the crown and removed after the coronation until 1911, when it was permanently set with 444 precious and semi-precious stones. Imitation pearls on the arches and base were replaced with gold beads which at the time were platinum-plated.

It was used to crown his successor George VI in 1937, and Queen Elizabeth II in 1953, who adopted a stylised image of the crown for use on coats of arms, badges, logos and various other insignia in the Commonwealth realms to symbolise her royal authority. In these contexts, it replaced the Tudor Crown, which had been instated by Edward VII in 1901. Use of the crown's image in this way is by permission of the monarch.

On 4 June 2013, St Edward's Crown was displayed on the high altar in Westminster Abbey at a service marking the 60th anniversary of Elizabeth II's coronation, the first time it had left the Jewel House at the Tower of London since 1953.

In December 2022 the crown was removed from the Tower of London to be resized ahead of the Coronation of Charles III and Camilla on 6 May 2023.

See also
 Coronation crown
 Canadian royal symbols

References

Bibliography

External links

The Crown Jewels at the royal family website

Crown Jewels of the United Kingdom
Individual crowns
Crowns in heraldry
National symbols of the United Kingdom
National symbols of Canada
1661 works
Edward the Confessor
Charles II of England